The discography of Polish-born singer-songwriter Basia consists of five solo studio albums, two live albums, seven compilations, and thirty-one singles. The artist has also released one video album and numerous music videos. Commercially, Basia's most successful period were the years 1987–1994 when she was signed to Epic Records. Her best-selling single reportedly is 1990's "Cruising for Bruising" from London Warsaw New York which in turn is her most successful album. The singer has enjoyed biggest commercial success in the US, Japan, France, and her native Poland.

For Basia's discography with Matt Bianco see Matt Bianco discography.

Albums

Studio albums

Live albums

Compilation albums

Singles

As lead artist

As featured artist

Other appearances
 1984: Matt Bianco – Whose Side Are You On?
 1985: David Cassidy – Romance (song "Romance (Let Your Heart Go)")
 1993: Perfect – Historie nieznane 1971–1991 (song "Obłęd w podmiejskiej dyskotece")
 1996: Peter White – Caravan of Dreams (song "Just Another Day")
 1999: Spyro Gyra – Got the Magic (song "Springtime Laughter")
 1999: Taro Hakase – Duets (song "So Nice (Summer Samba)")
 2004: Matt Bianco – Matt's Mood
 2009: Peter White – Good Day (song "Love Will Find You")
 2014: Monika Lidke – If I Was to Describe You (song "Tum Tum Song")
 2015: Pectus – Kobiety (song "Ostatnia z niedziel")

Videography

Video albums

Music videos

References

External links
 Official website
 
 

Discographies of Polish artists
Jazz discographies
Pop music discographies